Natural Language Semantics Markup Language is a markup language for providing systems (like Voice Browsers) with semantic interpretations for a variety of inputs, including speech and natural language text input. Natural Language Semantics Markup Language is currently a World Wide Web Consortium Working Draft.

See also
 VoiceXML
 SRGS
 Semantic Interpretation for Speech Recognition

External links
 SRGS Specification (W3C Recommendation)
 Natural Language Semantics Markup Language for the Speech Interface Framework (W3C Working Draft)
 W3C's Voice Browser Working Group

World Wide Web Consortium standards
XML-based standards